Phonophoresis, also known as sonophoresis, is the method of using ultrasound waves to increase skin permeability in order to improve the effectiveness of transdermal drug delivery. This method intersects drug delivery and ultrasound therapy. Phonophoresis is able to achieve specific and efficient delivery of drugs that are delivered through the skin and ensure that the drug reaches the targeted area in the tissue environment. By assisting transdermal drug delivery, phonophoresis can help patients experience painless, minimal risk, and effective treatment.

Background
The primary purpose of phonophoresis is to assist in transdermal drug delivery, usually with the help of a coupling agent or medium. One of the major obstacles to transdermal drug delivery is permeating the skin to reach a targeted area within the body. The stratum corneum is the layer of skin that prevents foreign substances from penetrating the body. This results in decreased permeability of the skin, which prevents effective drug delivery. Efforts to use phonophoresis are due to the interest in transdermal drug delivery. Transdermal drug delivery is beneficial because of patient compliance, the ability to avoid digestive system degradation, and the ability to use drugs with short half-lives.

Treatment

Treatment Methods
Phonophoresis can be performed using two main methods. The first is simultaneous treatment, where the drug can be applied at the same time as the ultrasound. The second method is pretreatment, where the ultrasound is used briefly before drug delivery. This ensures that the skin is permeable prior to the drug being applied.

Cavitation is important in understanding how to increase skin permeability through ultrasound. When using an ultrasound, cavities will develop due to the pressure change. Stable cavitation describes repetitive oscillations of a cavity bubble, while inertial cavitation describes the collapse of a cavity bubble. If the developed cavities fall apart, the effect on the stratum corneum lipids will increase the permeability of the skin. These areas of increased permeability are often called localized transport regions, where there is lower electrical resistivity. One potential method to take advantage of cavitation is the use of a cavitation seed at the surface of the skin. Another potential method is to use ultrasound- responsive liquid-core nuclei (URLN).

Frequency
Low frequency ultrasound is seen as the optimal level of ultrasound frequency. This is typically characterized as 20 to 100 kHz (sometimes 18 to 100 kHz). Low frequency can achieve optimal skin permeability because cavitation is more likely to occur at low frequencies than high frequencies. For reference, high frequency ultrasound is typically in the range of 1 to 3 MHz.

Coupling Agents
Coupling agents help the function of the ultrasound. The physical component of the drug is also important in allowing the ultrasound to better facilitate delivery. The drug should be able to work together with the coupling agent or can serve as the coupling agent. One particular application of a coupling gel agent working with a drug is described in a 2019 study that utilizes the drug diclofenac in coordination with thiocolchioside gel to treat patients who suffer from acute lower back pain. An application of a drug serving as a coupling agent is the use of piroxicam gel mixtures and dexamethasone sodium phosphate gel mixtures to treat patients who suffer from carpal tunnel syndrome.

Applications

Physical Conditions
Phonophoresis is primarily used to address physical conditions, as phonophoresis would be used with drug delivery through the skin surface. Various conditions that can be addressed include cervical spine pain, acute lower back pain, carpal tunnel syndrome, muscle injury, rheumatoid arthritis, and venous thrombosis. Examples of drugs that have been used with sonophoresis include hydrocortisone, mannitol, dexamethasone, and lidocaine.

Several products have been marketed to use phonophoresis for transdermal drug delivery. Examples include the U-strip, SonoPrep, and Sonoderm Technology.

Other Uses
A future application of phonophoresis is to use it with vaccines, as phonophoresis is a less painful and more appealing alternative to needles. Another potential use is in cancer therapeutics; one such application that has been explored is the delivery of cisplatin for patients who have cervical cancer. Going forward, genetic skin diseases and wound healing can also be assisted with phonophoresis. An example of a wound healing application is the use of phonophoresis to assist microneedles in delivering drugs to treat keloids.

Limitations

Risks
Phonophoresis is relatively safe, which makes it appealing to clinicians. At an optimal frequency, phonophoresis will have minimal to no risk and patients will not experience pain. How long the ultrasound is used, and the intensity of the ultrasound is also important to consider. One concern is how long phonophoresis can be used before it poses a risk to patient health. The heat that is emitted from ultrasound use can also be damaging to the surface of the skin, and cavitation can potentially lead to tissue damage. Nanoparticle toxicity is another potential risk.

References

Drug delivery devices